Martin Stiles Fishburn (March 18, 1844 – December 22, 1926) was an American politician in the state of Washington. He served in the Washington House of Representatives from 1895 to 1897.

References

Republican Party members of the Washington House of Representatives
1844 births
1926 deaths